Pontixanthobacter luteolus  is a Gram-negative, halophilic and non-spore-forming bacterium from the genus Pontixanthobacter which has been isolated from tidal flat from the Yellow Sea in Korea.

References 

Sphingomonadales
Bacteria described in 2005
Halophiles